The Philippine Sports Center is a sporting venue under-construction inside the Ciudad de Victoria development which spans over Bocaue and Santa Maria, Bulacan, Philippines. The sporting center will host an Olympic-size swimming pool and a multi-purpose gymnasium. Like the nearby Philippine Arena and the Philippine Sports Stadium, the Iglesia ni Cristo owned facility will be opened to the public.

References

Basketball venues in the Philippines
Swimming venues in the Philippines
Tennis venues in the Philippines
Buildings and structures in Bulacan
Sports in Bulacan
Tourist attractions in Bulacan